Qin Weizhong (born July 1971) is a Chinese politician who is the current mayor of Shenzhen, in office since April 2021.

Biography
Qin was born in Yulin, Guangxi, in July 1971. After graduating from Tsinghua University in 1996, he was assigned to the China Petrochemical Corporation as an engineer.

He joined the Chinese Communist Party in June 2001. In March 2017, Qin was promoted to deputy general manager of China National Petroleum Corporation and chairman of China Petroleum Engineering Co., Ltd.

In March 2017, he was appointed vice governor of Guangdong. In April 2021, he was promoted to be deputy party secretary of Shenzhen, concurrently holding the acting mayor position. He was installed as mayor in May of that same year.

References

1971 births
Living people
People from Yulin, Guangxi
Tsinghua University alumni
People's Republic of China politicians from Guangxi
Chinese Communist Party politicians from Guangxi